Dermatobotrys is a rare plant genus endemic to coastal scarp forests in Madagascar and from southern Zululand to the Transkei in South Africa. Its flowers are tubular and deep red, followed by smooth, brownish fruit.

References 
 Bolus, 1894 In: Hook. Icon. pl. 20: (1890) t. 1940, et in Bot. Mag. t. 7369
 The Plant List entry
 PlantZAfrica entry

Scrophulariaceae
Monotypic Lamiales genera
Scrophulariaceae genera